Streptomyces cellulolyticus is a cellulolytic bacterium species from the genus of Streptomyces.

See also 
 List of Streptomyces species

References

Further reading 
 
 
 
 

cellulolyticus
Bacteria described in 1997